Sagaba Konate (born March 19, 1997) is a Malian professional basketball player for ratiopharm Ulm of the German Basketball Bundesliga. He played college basketball for the West Virginia Mountaineers. A native of Bamako, he moved to the United States to play at Kennedy Catholic High School starting in his junior season. As a sophomore at West Virginia, he was named third-team All-Big 12 and made the conference All-Defensive Team.

High school career
Konate, who grew up playing soccer, only started playing basketball in 2014. He credits his improvement to time spent in the weight room. Jeff Kollar and his wife became Konate's legal guardians as he attended Kennedy Catholic High School. At the high school level, Konate earned Player of the Year and All-State honors in Pennsylvania and was a three-star recruit entering college.

College career
As a college player, Konate established himself as an expert shot-blocker, averaging 3.2 blocks per game in his sophomore year, which was 3rd in the nation for Division I. In addition, he averaged 10.8 points and 7.6 rebounds per contest. Konate flirted with the 2018 NBA draft, but ultimately withdrew his name and returned to West Virginia. During his junior year, Konate broke the WVU all-time record for blocked shots with 191. He spent most of the season sidelined due to a knee injury. After the 2018-2019 season, Konate declared for the 2019 NBA draft foregoing his senior year.

Professional career
After going undrafted, Konate signed with the Toronto Raptors of the National Basketball Association on July 23, 2019. He was waived and then added to the roster of their NBA G League affiliate, the Raptors 905. Konate fractured his metatarsal in the preseason but returned in January 2020. He averaged 4.7 points and 2.2 rebounds per game.

On August 20, 2020, Konate signed with Casademont Zaragoza of the Liga ACB. On November 29, 2020 Konate announced he had signed with Greek club PAOK Thessaloniki.

On June 25, 2021, he signed with Pallacanestro Trieste of the Italian Lega Basket Serie A.

On July 23, 2022, he has signed with ratiopharm Ulm of the German Basketball Bundesliga.

National team career
Konate has represented the under-20 Mali national basketball team, winning a bronze medal at the 2014 FIBA Africa Under-18 Championship.

Career statistics

College

|-
| style="text-align:left;"| 2016–17
| style="text-align:left;"| West Virginia
| 37 || 2 || 10.9 || .564 || – || .636 || 2.8 || .3 || .4 || 1.4 || 4.1
|-
| style="text-align:left;"| 2017–18
| style="text-align:left;"| West Virginia
| 36 || 36 || 25.4 || .510 || – || .790 || 7.6 || .7 || .4 || 3.2 || 10.8
|-
| style="text-align:left;"| 2018–19
| style="text-align:left;"| West Virginia
| 8 || 7 || 24.1 || .435 || .391 || .813 || 8.0 || 1.4 || .8 || 2.8 || 13.6
|- class="sortbottom"
| style="text-align:center;" colspan="2"| Career
| 81 || 45 || 18.7 || .509 || .391 || .756 || 5.5 || .6 || .4 || 2.4 || 8.0

References

External links
West Virginia Mountaineers bio
RealGM profile

1997 births
Living people
21st-century Malian people
Basket Zaragoza players
Malian expatriate basketball people in Canada
Malian expatriate basketball people in the United States
Liga ACB players
Malian expatriate basketball people in Spain
Malian expatriate basketball people in Greece
Malian men's basketball players
P.A.O.K. BC players
Pallacanestro Trieste players
Power forwards (basketball)
Raptors 905 players
Ratiopharm Ulm players
Sportspeople from Bamako
West Virginia Mountaineers men's basketball players
Malian expatriate basketball people in Italy
Malian expatriate basketball people in Germany